Pātaka Art + Museum is a municipal museum and art gallery of Porirua City, New Zealand. Te Marae o Te Umu Kai o Hau is the name of the building where Pātaka Museum + Art is located and opened in 1998. It also houses the Porirua City Library, Cafe Kaizen and a Japanese Garden.

History
In 1980 the Porirua Museum opened and by 1997 had outgrown its Takapūwāhia site. At the same time, the Mana Community Arts Council wished to expand their community art gallery located on the corner of Parumoana and Norrie Streets. The two organisations amalgamated, moving into the newly renovated and expanded site in 1998.

Bob Cater was awarded the Queen's Service Medal and Darcy Nicholas was appointed a Companion of the Queen's Service Order, in part for their roles in establishing the museum.

References

External links
 

New Zealand art
Art museums and galleries in New Zealand
Porirua